The Health Industry Business Communications Council (HIBCC) is a primary standard-setting and educational organization for healthcare bar coding in the United States. It provides publications, trade shows, educational resources, conferences and training programs.

History 

The Health Industry Business Communications Council was established in 1983 as an industry-sponsored non-profit council by major health care associations to develop a standard for data transfer using uniform bar code labeling. Over time it expanded its focus to include additional electronic data interchange standards.

Governance and overview

In collaboration with the standardisation attempts of the international healthcare industry, the council administers and maintains the following standards and services:

 Health Industry Bar Code Supplier Labeling Standard
 Health Industry Bar Code Provider Application Standard
 Health Industry Bar Code Positive Identification for Patient Safety
 Health Industry Bar Code RFID
 Health Industry Bar Code Syntax Standard
 Universal Product Number Repository
 Health Industry Number System

A board of directors oversees operations and sets policy. Members are appointed from the ranks of the council's member organizations, which represent the healthcare industry.  Previous and current appointments have been made by various organizations, including:
 Advanced Medical Technology Association
 American Hospital Association
 American Medical Association
 American Society for Automation in Pharmacy
 American Veterinary Distributors Association
 Association for Healthcare Resource and Materials Management
 Federation of American Hospitals
 Health Industry Distributors Association
 Healthcare Information and Management Systems Society
 Healthcare Distribution and Management Association
 Healthcare Supply Chain Association
 Pharmaceutical Research and Manufacturers Association
 US Department of Defense

The Health Industry Business Communications Council's broad mission consistently expands to meet industry requirements. The council is involved in a number of areas including electronic data interchange message formats, bar code labeling data standards, universal numbering systems, and the provision of databases which assure common identifiers.

Health Industry Bar Code international standards 

The Health Industry Bar Code is an industrial standard. It applies a versatile and technology independent data structure for unique identification of medical devices.

The Health Industry Business Communications Council is accredited by the American National Standards Institute. Its primary function is to support electronic communications by developing appropriate standards for information exchange among healthcare trading partners. The bar code has been standardized in the institute's2.5:2015 and referenced by ISO/IEC 15418: 2016.

The first letter in the visible code and in the optical and electronic codes is a worldwide reserved + sign, according to ISO/IEC 15418:2016.

The application of coding according to standard ANSI HIBC 2.5:2015 and ISO/IEC 15418:2016 is free of charge. Only formal registration of the labeler identification code is subject to a license fee.

The preferred code symbologies and technologies to represent bar code are:

 the optical Barcode Code 128 defined in ISO/IEC 15417:2009
 the data matrix code complies with the structures defined in ISO/IEC 16022:2006
 the Data matrix rectangular extension defined in DIN 16587 DMRE:2015
 the electronic RFID-HF and RFID-UHF codes compliant with the structures defined in ISO/IEC 18000-3:2010 HF, ISO/IEC 18000-63:2013 UHF). 
 the Codablock code as defined with the structures defined in ISO/IEC 15424. Usage is fading out by replacing with other 2-d symbols like Data Matrix

Millions of medical and surgical products as tools and pharmaca regularly bear the Health Industry Bar Code Standard label.

 In Europe, the Health Industry Bar Code standard is accredited by the European Committee for Standardization and it is also referenced in various International Organization for Standardization standards related to labeling of medical and surgical products.
 In the US, the standard is an FDA-UDI accredited coding system for alpha numeric product codes of up to 18 characters length and concatenated production data (UDI-Production Identifier PI).

A distinguishing characteristic of the Health Industry Bar Code is that it permits encoding of both alphabetic and numeric characters, thereby providing manufacturers the ability to directly encode their product identifications, many of which are alphanumeric. This eliminates the need to convert them to all-numeric substitutes, which in turn reduces the possibility of encoding errors.  These must be minimized to avoid medical errors caused by incorrect product identification in hospitals. Hence companies that use the Heath Industry Bard Code labeling format are in compliance with voluntary standards in the institutional healthcare supply channel.

Auto-ID/technical committee

The Auto-ID/UPN Committee maintains Health Industry Bar Code standards which provide healthcare-specific data structures and labeling options for medical/surgical products and patient care.  The committee is composed of healthcare manufacturer, distributor and provider representatives, and companies that develop automatic identification equipment.  The committee functions and conducts its activities in conformance with all American National Standards Institute requirements.

Health Industry Number

The Health Industry Number is a nine-character, alphanumeric identifier assigned to every facility, delivery location and business activity in the healthcare supply chain.  Each number is consistent, unique and flexible enough to represent a facility and the numerous ship-to locations within its organization.  The number consists of a 7-character base and a 2-character suffix.

The base Health Industry Number consists of 6 alphanumeric characters (0-9, A-Z) followed by a single modulo 36 check digit. System developers can confirm the validity of a Health Industry Number by summing the values of the first six characters (where 0=0 ... 9=9, A=10, B=11, ... Z=35), taking the modulo 36 of this sum, and compare it to the value of the 7th digit. For example, given a Health Industry Number of '740WL3V00', the base number is '740WL3V', which computes as 7 + 4 + 0 + 32 + 21 + 3 = 67. 67 modulo 36 = 31. The value of the 7th (check) digit is V, and given V=31, the Health Industry Number is valid.

Suffix validation requires additional investigation. Record layout specifications indicate the suffix is always “ØØ” for facility records, or a sequentially ascending suffix beginning at “FØ” for prescriber or location records. This means a suffix of '10' is invalid.

As administrator of the Health Industry Number system, the Health Industry Business Communications Council applies a uniform identification standard to all entities submitted for enumeration.  The standardization process includes a review to eliminate database duplication and information verification. Since inception, the number of records in the Health Industry Number database has grown from 7,000 hospitals to more than 1.5 million facility records.

The Health Industry Number has become an integral component of many supply chain processes, including membership and pricing eligibility.  Industry trading partners access the database via the online Health Industry Business Communications Council iHealth Industry Number web site, as well as via EDI transmissions from the Health Industry Business Communications Council, several Value Added Networks, and by periodic distributions of the full database from the Health Industry Business Communications Council.

The Health Industry Number system is intended to be a “bridge” between a company's internal account numbers and the account numbers of its trading partners.  Through a centralized and standardized repository, the system provides consistency and accuracy of customer identification for hundreds of major manufacturers, distributors and provider organizations, as well as US government agencies such as the Department of Defense, US Public Health Service, the Veterans' Administration Hospital System, and the Centers for Disease Control.

At present, the Health Industry Number database includes hospitals, nursing homes, clinics, buying groups, pharmacies, manufacturers, distributors – virtually any entity providing service in the healthcare supply chain.  It is widely used in both the private and public sector for e-commerce transmissions.

Health Industry Number User Group

The Health Industry Number User Group provides a forum for subscribers to address questions about the system with council staff and other users.  The User Group is also responsible for maintaining and updating the database structure, reviewing industry activities related to database structure, and developing marketing and educational strategies.

HIN databases
 Facility Database – includes all health care facilities identified by SHIP TO addresses
 Prescriber Database – includes physicians, dentists and other individual practitioners
 Animal Health Database – includes both veterinarians and animal health facilities, identified by practice location and 'ship to' address respectively

References

External links
 Health Industry Business Communications Council

Barcodes
Medical and health organizations based in Arizona
Organizations established in 1983